The 2002 Copa Norte was the sixth and last edition of a football competition held in Brazil. Featuring 16 clubs, Amazonas have three vacancies; Amapá, Maranhão, Pará, Piauí, Rondônia and Roraima with two each; and Acre with one. 

In the finals, Paysandu defeated São Raimundo 4–0 on aggregate to win their first title and earn the right to play in the 2002 Copa dos Campeões.

Qualified teams

First stage

Group A

Group B

Group C

Group D

Second stage

Group E

Group F

Finals

Paysandu won 4–0 on aggregate.

References

Copa Norte
Copa Norte
Copa Norte